= Harrod Sport =

British sports equipment manufacturer

- Type: Private Limited Company
- Founded: 1954
- Founder: Ron Harrod
- Headquarters: Lowestoft, United Kingdom
- Products: Manufacturer of sporting equipment and netting
- Number of employees: 136
- Website: www.harrodsport.com

Harrod Sport is a British manufacturer of sporting equipment and netting based in Lowestoft, Suffolk. It is a family-run business founded in 1954 by the current chairman Ron Harrod, who converted fishing nets in to gardening and agricultural netting. The association with sports began when Harrod Sport was approached to produce a pair of football nets and the accompanying football posts.

== History ==
Ron Harrod founded Harrod Sport in 1954 following an initial investment of £300. This was used to purchase and then transform fishing nets in to gardening and agricultural netting. The year of 1954 ended with a successful £5000 turnover and Harrod Sport Ltd was established.

In 1957, Harrod Sport produced its first pair of football nets following a request from a local school teacher. This in 1959, Harrod Sport teamed up with local tradesmen to produce its first wooden and steel goals. This resulted in Harrod Sport selling six sets in the first season of manufacturing.

In 1963, Harrod Sport purchased its first netting and steel cutting machine. In 1978, a new 16,000 Sq Ft factory was built on the South Lowestoft Industrial Estate (formally known as Cooke Park). Harrod Sport installed its first powder coating machine in 1979, acquired its first specialist delivery lorry in 1980 and purchased a robotic welder in 1985.

In 2015, Harrod Sport remains a family run organisation which is jointly owned by Chris and Stephanie Harrod, who are accompanied on the board by the two non-family directors.

In 2017, Harrod Sport expanded and opened the Innovation Centre, with over 800 square metres of office and workshop space creating a unique environment for designing, developing and prototyping new products.
